Yangjian is a town in Xishan District, Wuxi, Jiangsu, China. , it administers Yangjian Residential Neighborhood and the following eight villages:
Yangjian Village
Nan Village
Wanshan Village
Langxia Village
Nanfeng Village
Yanjiaqiao Village
Li'an Village
Longfengxiang Village

References

Township-level divisions of Jiangsu
Wuxi